St. Peter's College, Kolenchery, is a general degree college located in Kolenchery, Kerala. It was established in the year 1964. The college is affiliated with Mahatma Gandhi University. This college offers different courses in arts, commerce and science.

Departments

Science

Physics
Chemistry
Mathematics
Botany
Biotechnology
Zoology

Arts and Commerce

Malayalam
English
Hindi
History
Political Science
Economics
Physical Education
Commerce
Travel and tourism management

Accreditation
The college is recognized by the University Grants Commission (UGC).

References

External links
http://www.stpeterscollege.ac.in

Universities and colleges in Ernakulam district
Educational institutions established in 1964
1964 establishments in Kerala
Arts and Science colleges in Kerala
Colleges affiliated to Mahatma Gandhi University, Kerala